Courtney Meneely (born 25 May 1994) also known as Courtney Wright  is a Northern Irish international lawn bowler.

Bowls career
Meneely became the Irish champion in 2018 after winning the singles at the Irish National Bowls Championships and was named Irish bowler of the year. In 2019 she won the triples bronze medal at the Atlantic Bowls Championships.

In 2022, she competed in the women's triples and the Women's fours at the 2022 Commonwealth Games.

References

Female lawn bowls players from Northern Ireland
Living people
1994 births
Bowls players at the 2022 Commonwealth Games